Majid Derakhshani (Persian: مجید درخشانی) (born 13 September 1957 in Sangesar, Imperial State of Iran) is an Iranian musician and composer.

He was born into a family of artists from the Iranian province Semnan, Sangesar.

Subsequent to his emigration to Germany he founded the Nawa Musikzentrum in Cologne; the primary and most active center for Persian classical music outside of Iran.

He has published Many Albums cooperation with the best artists such as Mohammadreza Shajarian , Homayoun Shajarian , ....

Also many Concerts in around the world.

References

 Music of Iran, Traditional Modernists: Majid Derakhshani, BBC Persian, Retrieved 24 October 2010.

External links

 Majid Derakhshani on Youtube

Iranian composers
Persian classical musicians
Iranian tar players
Iranian setar players
Iranian emigrants to Germany
Living people
Year of birth uncertain
1956 births
People from Semnan Province